The Nazareth Key is a weekly newspaper based in Nazareth, Pennsylvania. It has a circulation of 31,000 throughout Northampton County, Pennsylvania, and is the largest circulated weekly newspaper in Northampton County. Its content includes largely of classified ads, but also has some community-related news articles.

External links
Official site

Newspapers published in Pennsylvania